Jampani is a village in Vemuru mandal, located in Guntur district of the Indian state of Andhra Pradesh.

Transport

APSRTC operates busses from Tenali on Tenali – Kollur route. Zampani railway station is located on Tenali–Repalle branch line of Guntur-Repalle section. It is administered under Guntur railway division of South Central Railways.

See also 
 Vemuru mandal

References

Villages in Guntur district